Taeniurops is a genus of stingrays in the family Dasyatidae. Its two species were formerly contained within the genus Taeniura.

Species
Taeniurops grabata (Geoffroy St. Hilaire, 1817) (Round fantail stingray)
Taeniurops meyeni (J. P. Müller & Henle, 1841) (Round ribbontail ray)

References

Dasyatidae